The 2004 German Athletics Championships were held at the Eintracht-Stadion in Braunschweig on 10–11 July 2004.

Results

Men

Women

References 
 Results sources:
 Men: 
 Women: 

2004
German Athletics Championships
German Athletics Championships
German Athletics Championships